

Biography

Anjali Parvati Koda is a playwright, a writer-director in Telugu films, co-founder of Hyderabad's theatre group Samahaara, and a stand up comedian. She's also acted in plays such as Hamlet and Anton Chekov's The Bear.

Theatre

The Importance of Being Earnest by Oscar Wilde (English) (Producer)
Court Martial by Swadesh Deepak (Hindi) (Producer)
The Bear by Anton Chekhov (English) (Actor)
The Proposal by Anton Chekhov (English) (Producer)
Hamlet by William Shakespeare (English) (Actor)
Dominic Wesley by Anjali Parvati Koda (English) (Writer)
The Zoo Story by Edward Albee (English) (Producer)
Purushotham by Anjali Parvati Koda (English) (Writer)
The Crest of the Peacock by Sarada Devi (English) (Actor-Dancer)
Maranoparanth by Surendra Varma (Hindi) (Actor)
Taj Mahal Ka Tender by Ajay Shukla (Hindi) (Producer)
Karna by Anjali Parvati Koda (English) (Writer)
12 Angry Men by Reginald Rose (English) (Producer)
Gregor Samsa by Anjali Parvati Koda (English) (Writer)
The Good Doctor by Neil Simon (English) (Producer)
Farewell by Team Samahaara (Multilingual) (Producer)
The Last Wish Baby Adapted by Anjali Parvati Koda and Team Samahaara (Multilingual) (Writer-Editor)

References

Living people
Telugu-language dramatists and playwrights
Year of birth missing (living people)
Indian women dramatists and playwrights
20th-century Indian dramatists and playwrights
20th-century Indian women writers
Screenwriters from Hyderabad, India
Women writers from Telangana
Indian women screenwriters
Telugu screenwriters